Meredith Douglas Young,  (born September 20, 1940 in Tracadie, New Brunswick) is a Canadian politician both provincial and federal spanning two decades.

Provincial politics
He was first elected to the Legislative Assembly of New Brunswick in 1978 as a Liberal Member of the Legislative Assembly (MLA). He was elected leader of the New Brunswick Liberal Party in 1982, but resigned within a year of his rising to that post due to a poor showing in the 1982 provincial election. When the Liberals formed a government under Frank McKenna in 1987, Young served as Minister of Fisheries.

Federal politics
Young left provincial politics to run in the 1988 federal election for the Liberal Party of Canada, and was elected to the House of Commons of Canada as a Liberal Member of Parliament (MP).

With the election of a Liberal government in the 1993 election, the new Prime Minister, Jean Chrétien, appointed Young to the Canadian cabinet as Minister of Transport. In that position, Young eliminated the Crow Rate which regulated the cost western farmers had to pay to transport their goods via rail, and privatized the Canadian National Railway.

In January 1996, he became Minister of Employment and Immigration (subsequently retitled Minister of Human Resources Development) and Minister of Labour. In October 1996, he was appointed Minister of National Defence and Minister of Veterans Affairs.

As Defence Minister, Young generated much criticism when, in 1997, he suspended the formal inquiry into the Somalia Affair in which Canadian troops had been accused of mistreating prisoners in Somalia in 1993.

Young was an outspoken and even bombastic politician, once calling Reform Party MP Deborah Grey "a slab of bacon" in the House. (The Hansard record of 3 April 1989 records that Young, along with the N.D.P. MP for Edmonton East, Ross Harvey, escorted Grey into the House that day.)

In one of the chief upsets of the 1997 election, Young was defeated in his riding by Yvon Godin of the New Democratic Party. The Liberal government's changes to Unemployment Insurance were a key factor in his defeat because of the large number of seasonal workers in Young's riding. This was also a factor in the defeat of Young's Cabinet colleague and fellow Maritimer David Dingwall.

Since his defeat, Young has worked in Ottawa as a lobbyist. Despite his Liberal affiliations, Young supported the candidacy of Tom Long to lead the right-wing Canadian Alliance in that party's leadership election in 2000.

He supported Stéphane Dion for the leadership of the Liberal Party.

Electoral record

References

External links
 

1940 births
Living people
University of New Brunswick alumni
Lawyers in New Brunswick
Members of the 26th Canadian Ministry
Members of the House of Commons of Canada from New Brunswick
Liberal Party of Canada MPs
Canadian Ministers of Transport
Defence ministers of Canada
Members of the King's Privy Council for Canada
People from Gloucester County, New Brunswick
New Brunswick Liberal Association MLAs
New Brunswick Liberal Association leaders